Putative phosphatidylinositol 4-kinase alpha-like protein P2 is an enzyme that in humans is encoded by the PI4KAP2 gene.

References

Further reading

Proteins